The 5th Justice and Development Party Ordinary Congress was a party convention of the governing Turkish Justice and Development Party (AKP) that took place on 12 September 2015. It was held six weeks before Turkey voted in a snap general election in November 2015. The agenda included motions to alter the party's by-laws to lift the three-term limit for the party's MPs who had been elected for a third time in the June 2015 general election, as well as the establishment of a 'Founding Principles Board'.

The party leader and Prime Minister Ahmet Davutoğlu declared his candidacy for re-election to the party leadership, with most commentators speculating that he would almost certainly be the only candidate. However, a few days before the Congress, it emerged that Binali Yıldırım, a former Transport Minister and Special Advisor to the President of Turkey, had explored a possible run for the party leadership. It was rumoured that Yıldırım had been asked to run by President Recep Tayyip Erdoğan due to a breakdown in relations with Davutoğlu. Yıldırım stated that had a '50% chance' of running. In the event that he did declare his candidacy, the congress would be the first ever to hold a leadership election with more than one candidate. However, after a disagreement over the party's provisional Central Executive Board candidates between Erdoğan and Davutoğlu was solved at the last minute, it was reported that Yıldırım had stopped collecting signatures for a possible leadership bid and the party's spokesperson Beşir Atalay stated that Davutoğlu would be the only candidate.

Date and venue
The date of Saturday, 12 September 2015 was formally announced by the party's spokesperson Beşir Atalay on 18 August 2015. The date was chosen to coincide with the anniversary of the 1980 Turkish coup d'état. The venue was announced as the Ankara Arena. AKP congresses have usually taken place in the Autumn, with an election in November meaning that a date in mid September was seen as the most ideal.

Agenda

Preparations
Due to an outbreak of violence between the Turkish Armed Forces and the Kurdistan Workers' Party (PKK) and recent casualties suffered by the Army, the congress took place in a subdued atmosphere with tough security measures. Over 40 thousand AKP supporters were expected to take part, though the actual figures stood at 12 thousand. The congress was attended by many of the AKP's founders, many of whom are no longer MPs due to the three-term limit barring them from standing for a fourth time in the June 2015 general election. An invitation was sent to former AKP Prime Minister and President Abdullah Gül, though he stated that he would not take part. Observers from the Peoples' Democratic Party (HDP), which has been accused of supporting the PKK, were not invited, while it was rumoured that the Nationalist Movement Party (MHP) would not send any observers either. Over 20 newspapers and media channels were banned from observing the congress.

By-law changes
Two proposed changes to the party's by-laws were brought before the congress. This included the lifting of the three-term limit on parliamentary candidacies for MPs who would otherwise have not been able to contest the November 2015 general election. The reasoning was that due to the short tenure of the 25th Parliament (June–November 2015), it should not be counted as a proper term towards an MP's three term allowance. As such, MPs who were elected for a third term in June 2015 would still remain on the November 2015 party lists. The by-laws also included a formation of a Founding Principles Board.

Leadership election

Candidates
Ahmet Davutoğlu, the incumbent party leader and Prime Minister of Turkey ( contesting).
Binali Yıldırım, Special advisor to the President of Turkey and former Minister of Transport, Maritime and Communication ( withdrew).

Ahmet Davutoğlu was expected to be the only candidate for the leadership, with all of the party's ordinary and extraordinary congresses having taken place with only a single leadership candidate. However, the AKP's poor performance at the June 2015 general election and signs of disagreement between Davutoğlu and President Recep Tayyip Erdoğan raised the prospect of Binali Yıldırım running against Davutoğlu. Yıldırım confirmed speculation that he was exploring a possible run, collecting signatures from supportive delegates. He claimed that there was a 50% chance of him running. The AKP's deputy leader Numan Kurtulmuş was unable to confirm that there was only one candidate when asked during an interview, with many commentators suggesting that Yıldırım was supported and encouraged to run by Erdoğan, to which Yıldırım serves as a special advisor.

After a disagreement over the party's provisional Central Executive Board candidates between Erdoğan and Davutoğlu was solved at the last minute, it was reported that Yıldırım had stopped collecting signatures for a possible leadership bid and the party's spokesperson Beşir Atalay stated that Davutoğlu would be the only candidate.

During the congress, only Davutoğlu declared his candidacy for the leadership.

Results

Central Decision Executive Board election
Although there was a possibility of two rival Central Decision Executive Board (MKYK) candidate lists contesting the election, a last minute resolution between Davutoğlu and Erdoğan meant that only one MKYK candidate list stood for election. The list of the MKYK candidates and the votes they received are as follows.

See also
2014 Justice and Development Party Extraordinary Congress

References

External links

2015 elections in Turkey
Justice and Development Party (Turkey)
September 2015 events in Turkey